Bedford High School is a school for boys and girls in the Bedford area of Leigh, Greater Manchester, England.

History
Bedford High School was established in 1976 when the town's grammar schools were abolished by the 1976 Education Act. It was formed by merging Leigh Boys' Grammar School and neighbouring Manchester Road Secondary Modern School. The former grammar school buildings now form the upper school and the secondary modern buildings form the lower school. In 2003 the school gained specialist Business and Enterprise College status and opened a construction training facility in conjunction with the Construction Industry Training Board (CITB).

Performance
In 2008, 37% of pupils achieved five GCSE passes at grade A* to C including Mathematics and English, while 75% achieved five A* to C grades overall. These results were a significant improvement over 2007, when 29% of pupils achieved five GCSE passes at grade A* to C including Mathematics and English,
The school's Ofsted inspection in September 2004 stated that GCSE results were above that of similar schools.
The same Ofsted report rated the school as satisfactory with effective leadership and praised the school's relationship with the local community. It also highlighted issues with year 9 performance, the provision of modern languages and personal development, and the attitudes and behaviour of a number of boys in the school.

Notable former pupils

Leigh Grammar School

 Matt Aitken, English songwriter and record producer and the creative force behind the songwriting/production trio of Stock, Aitken and Waterman  
 Sir Alan Battersby, BP Professor of Organic Chemistry from 1969 to 1992 at the University of Cambridge
 George Henry Bolsover CBE, Director from 1947 to 1976 of the School of Slavonic and East European Studies
 Prof William Bradley, Professor of Colour Chemistry from 1948 to 1963 at the University of Leeds
 Sir Peter Maxwell Davies CBE, conductor and composer and President since 1983 of the Schools Music Association; Master of the Queen's Music from 2004
 Prof Sir David Gwynne Evans CBE; Director, National Institute for Biological Standards and Control (NIBSC) 1972-6; President, Society for General Microbiology 1972–75; Professor of Bacteriology and Immunology 1961–71 at the London School of Hygiene & Tropical Medicine; Director 1971-2 Lister Institute of Preventive Medicine
 Meredith Evans, Professor of Physical Chemistry from 1949 to 1952 at the University of Manchester
 Robert Forbes CBE, pianist and conductor, Principal from 1929 to 1953 of the Royal Manchester College of Music (now the Royal Northern College of Music), and President from 1938 to 1939 of the Incorporated Society of Musicians
 Eric Hassall CBE, director, 1994–2001, British Geological Survey Board; President 1997–99 Institute of Mining Engineers
 Cyril Hope OBE, CMaths, BSc, FIMA [Director Midland Mathematics Experiment, Head of Maths at Worcester College of Education 1953–1976]
 Roger Hunt, MBE, English former footballer and member of the England team that won the World Cup in 1966. 
 Prof Robin Leatherbarrow, Pro-Vice-Chancellor (Scholarship, Research & Knowledge Transfer) at Liverpool John Moores University. Previously professor of Biological and Biophysical Chemistry at Imperial College London, holding roles including Head of Research, Head of Chemical Biology Section, Deputy Head of Department, Acting Head of Department and Dean for the Faculty of Natural Sciences. 
 Sir John Lennard-Jones KBE FRS, theoretical chemist and physicist, first John Humphrey Plummer Professor of Theoretical Chemistry, University of Cambridge 1932–1953; second principal of the University College of North Staffordshire (now Keele University)
 Prof Basil Lythgoe, professor, 1953–78, Organic Chemistry at the University of Leeds
 James Maines CB, Director General from 1988 to 1995 of Guided Weapons and Electronic Systems at the Ministry of Defence
 Prof Michael Newton, Professor 1984–2001 of Pharmaceutics at the School of Pharmacy, University of London
 Sir David Phillips, Chief Constable, 1993–2003, Kent Police
 Rev Eric Shegog, Head, Religious Broadcasting, 1984–1990, IBA
Pete Shelley (Peter McNeish), singer, songwriter and guitarist, and leader of the Buzzcocks.
 Prof John Speakman FRS FRSE FRSA FMedSci Chair in Zoology. Institute of Biological and Environmental Sciences, University of Aberdeen 1000 Talents Professor and Novo Nordisk Great Wall Professor. Chinese Academy of Sciences, Institute of Genetics and Developmental Biology, Beijing, China.
 Prof John Speakman CBE, Professor of Textile Industries from 1939 to 1963 at the University of Leeds
 John Wallwork CBE, Chairman of the Press Association from 1973 to 1974, President of the Newspaper Society from 1977 to 1978 and managing director from 1972 to 1982 of Northcliffe Newspapers Group
 John Brunt from 1979 to 1984 all time leading goal scorer for Leigh Hockey Club and holds the record for the highest individual score in the cheshire cricket alliance of 204 not out

References

External links
 
 EduBase
 Ofsted reports for Bedford High School
 BBC Education league tables entry for Bedford High School (2007)

Educational institutions established in 1976
Secondary schools in the Metropolitan Borough of Wigan
1976 establishments in England
Community schools in the Metropolitan Borough of Wigan
Buildings and structures in Leigh, Greater Manchester